Lena Lootens is a Belgian soprano. She has performed in Claudio Monteverdi's L'Incoronazione di Poppea, and with the Concerto Vocale, amongst many others. On 23 June 1988 she performed two works by C. P. E. Bach, his Magnificat and the oratorio Die Israeliten in der Wüste, with soloists Nancy Argenta, Mechthild Georg, Howard Crook and Stephen Roberts under Frieder Bernius in the first concert of the Rheingau Musik Festival in Eberbach Abbey.

References

External links

Dutch operatic sopranos
Living people
Year of birth missing (living people)
20th-century Dutch women opera singers